The , or JSA, is the primary organizing body for professional shogi in Japan. The JSA sets the professional calendar, negotiates sponsorship and media  promotion deals, helps organize tournaments and title matches, publishes shogi-related materials, supervises and trains apprentice professionals as well as many other activities.

History
The Meijin title was hereditary and could only be held by members of these three families. These three schools were supported by the Tokugawa shogunate and thus controlled the professional shogi world up until 1868 when the Meiji Restoration began. By the time , the eighth and last head of the Itō school and the 11th Hereditary Meijin, had died in 1893, the influence of the families had decreased to such an extent that they had no real power at all.

Additionally, western Japan had its own separate organizations. The Tokyo Shogi Federation changed its name to Nihon Shōgi Renmei (日本将棋連盟) in 1927 with Sekine as president. In 1932, the president changed back to Doi with Sekine again as honorary president.  replaced Doi as president in 1934. However, the shogi world was split again in 1935 when a western guild of players called  with Chōtarō Hanada as its president separated from the eastern Nihon Shōgi Renmei due to a controversy over the 8-dan promotion of Tatsunosuke Kanda. With this merger, it became possible to hold the first Real Strength (nonhereditary) Meijin tournament. Yoshio Kimura, who became the first nonhereditary Meijin in 1937, replaced Sekine as president in 1938. In 1947, it officially changed its name back to Nihon Shōgi Renmei with Kimura still as president. In 1949, it became a legal entity (社団法人 shadan hōjin 'corporate person') for the first time.
The JSA celebrated its 81st anniversary in November 2005, which was significant because a shogi board consists of 81 squares.

Organization

Purpose
On its official website, the JSA states that its aims are "to contribute to the development of Japanese traditional culture, to help increase shogi's popularity and development as an art form, to contribute to spread an increased understanding of Japanese culture and traditions and to establish friendly exchanges with people of other countries through shogi".

Activities
Both the JSA's official homepage  and by-laws  list the official activities of the association as follows:
 Negotiate contracts with all domestic media (newspapers, magazines, TV, etc.) organizations regarding the provision of game scores for matches or tournaments sponsored by the association. This includes providing comments and analysis as needed.
 Issue a monthly magazine as well as publish game scores as necessary.
 Organize tournaments, meetings, or seminars as needed as well as establish branch offices or shogi "classrooms" wherever and whenever deemed appropriate.
 Foster the spread and instruction of shogi domestically through the training of certified teaching professionals.
 Increase the popularity of shogi internationally by holding and sponsoring international matches and supporting international tournaments.
 Foster the development of "Shogi-dō" or "The Art of Shogi" through the establishment of shogi clubs or through the lease of facilities to the general public for seminars and training, etc.
 Dispatch shogi professionals, etc. to various locations both domestically and internationally to increase shogi's popularity and to offer guidance and instruction.
 Enter into arrangements with various cultural organizations and promote cultural activities.
 Perform any activities other than those listed above which are deemed essential to achieving the association's objectives.

Status
The JSA officially registered as a  under Japanese law on April 1, 2011. Prior to that, the JSA had been officially registered as  since July 29, 1949.

Headquarters and other offices

The  of the JSA is located in the Sendagaya area of Tokyo's Shibuya Ward, while the main office for western Japan is the Kansai Shogi Kaikan located in Fukushima Ward, Osaka. In addition to the two main offices, there is also the Tokai Promotion Federation located in the Sakae area of Naka Ward, Nagoya.

In June 2019, the JSA announced that it would be moving its headquarters from its current location to a commercial property close to Sendagaya Station. The current JSA headquarters was built in 1976, and forty-years of aging needed to be addressed. A committee set up in June 2018 led by Yoshiharu Habu discussed options and presented them at the JSA's June 2019 General Meeting, where the members voted to move to a new location. JSA president Sato stated that he would continue negotiations either to purchase or lease a new location with the goal of completing the relocation some time around the year 2024.

In February 2021, the JSA announce that it would also be moving its Kansai office from Osaka to neighboring Takatsuki on property owned by the Takatsuki City government. The move is scheduled to be completed sometime in 2023. The current office will be demolished and the land sold to help offset the cost of the move. There was a proposal to rebuild at the existing location, but the cost of a temporary location was deemed prohibitive. The new office will have improved playing conditions, a TV studio and other new features. It will provide a major upgrade over the current facilities and also allow the JSA to better take advantage of the increase in shogi's popularity due to the impact of professional shogi player Sōta Fujii.

General meetings and the board of directors
Yasumitsu Satō is the current JSA president. Once a year (more often if needed), the JSA membership meets to discuss matters relevant to the association. Organizational matters, financial matters, disciplinary matters, etc. are all discussed and placed to a vote. Each regular member is given one vote.

Every two years, the JSA's board of directors is chosen during the annual meeting. No less than eight, but no more than twenty members are selected to be directors for a period of two years. The recently elected directors then choose one of their fellow directors to serve as president, one to serve as senior managing director, and no less than four to serve as executive directors. In addition, the general membership selects no more than three individuals to serve as the association's comptrollers. Directors, their relatives, persons having special relationships with directors, and JSA employees are not allowed to be comptrollers.

The JSA maintains a business office and hires staff to help manage the everyday affairs of the association as well as assist in other tasks deemed by the president to be important.

Past presidents
The following is a list of past presidents of the JSA.

Note: Names marked with an asterisk (*) died while in office.

Players

Members of the Japan Shogi Association are of two types: professional players (棋士 kishi) and women professional players (女流棋士 joryū kishi). As of 2017, there are no women who have qualified for the professional player group, which consists only of males as a result.

All professional players are members of the JSA. However, not all women professional players are members of the JSA. Other women professional players belong to a separate female shogi guild (日本女子プロ将棋協会 nihon joshi puro shōgi kyōkai ) or are free agents.

Other

Internet
The JSA maintains an online presence through its official website and Twitter account. The association also provides mobile app which provides some free content such as shogi-related news updates, but offers live tournament reports, game scores and detailed analysis, etc. for a fee. In addition, the JSA also owns and operates Shogi Club 24, an online shogi game site, and provides official support to the international shogi server 81Dojo.

The JSA has an official YouTube channel called "Shogi Association" where it provides instructional and event video clips hosted by JSA professionals and women's professionals as well as an official Twitter account for the channel.

Publications
The JSA has its own publishing division for shogi-related books, magazines, and other printed matter. Together with the Mynavi Publishing Corporation, the JSA published a weekly newspaper called Weekly Shogi from January 1984 to March 2016, but ceased publication due to changes in the media environoment. The JSA also publishes a monthly magazine called Shogi World. The JSA and MyNabi also operate official Twitter accounts for both publications.

International activities
The JSA maintains an international presence and promotes shogi internationally through 40 official chapters in 28 countries worldwide. These chapters are local shogi clubs or national federations which are officially recognized and supported by the JSA.

The JSA has also held an International Shogi Forum once every three years since 1999. The multi-day event includes individual and team tournaments involving representatives from overseas national shogi federations and Japan, simultaneous exhibitions by professionals and female professionals, displays of shogi equipment as well as various exchange events. The event has been held six times in Japan—Tokyo (1999, 2002, 2005), Tendō (2008),
Shizuoka (2014) and Kitakyushu (2017)—and once overseas, France (2011).

Matches of the Ryūō title tournament have occasionally been held overseas as well in Australia, China, England, France, Germany, Singapore, South Korea, Taiwan, Thailand, and the United States.

See also
Nihon Ki-in

Notes

References

External links 
 

Shogi organizations
Organizations based in Tokyo
Professional associations based in Japan
Public Interest Incorporated Associations (Japan)
1924 establishments in Japan
Cultural organizations based in Japan
Game associations